Tong Sheung Tsuen is a village in Lam Tsuen, Tai Po District, Hong Kong.

Administration
Tong Sheung Tsuen is a recognized village under the New Territories Small House Policy.

History
At the time of the 1911 census, the population of Tong Sheung Tsuen was 131. The number of males was 46.

References

External links
 Delineation of area of existing village Tong Sheung Tsuen (Tai Po) for election of resident representative (2019 to 2022)

Villages in Tai Po District, Hong Kong
Lam Tsuen